Steve Hull (born August 29, 1952) is a Canadian retired professional ice hockey player who played 60 games in the World Hockey Association with the Calgary Cowboys during the 1975–76 and 1976–77 seasons. As a youth, he played in the 1964 and 1965 Quebec International Pee-Wee Hockey Tournaments with a minor ice hockey team from Ottawa.

References

External links

1952 births
Calgary Cowboys players
Charlotte Checkers (SHL) players
Columbus Golden Seals players
Ice hockey people from Ottawa
Living people
Richmond Robins players
Tidewater Sharks players
Canadian ice hockey right wingers